Transphorm Inc. [NASDAQ:TGAN] is a semiconductor company focused on producing transistors made from gallium nitride (GaN) for use in switched-mode power supplies. It is headquartered in Goleta, California, close to the University of California at Santa Barbara (UCSB) from which the company is an offshoot and where the co-founder and CTO, Umesh Mishra, is a professor.

References 

Semiconductor companies of the United States
Technology companies established in 2007